Abasha is a district of Georgia, in the region of Samegrelo-Zemo Svaneti. Its main town is Abasha.

Population: 22,341 (2014 census)
Area: 323 km2

Sights

Memorial House of famous Georgian writer, Acad. Konstantine Gamsakhurdia

Politics
Abasha Municipal Assembly (Georgian: აბაშის საკრებულო) is a representative body in Abasha Municipality, consisting of 30 members which is elected every four years. The last election was held in October 2021. Giga Gabelaia of Georgian Dream was elected mayor.

Administrative divisions

Abasha municipality is divided into one city (ქალაქი, kalaki), 15 communities (თემი, temi), and 35 villages (სოფელი, sopeli):

Cities
 Abasha (including Kvatana, Noghokhashi, and Kapana)

Communities

 Dzveli Abasha
 Gezati
 Ketilari
 Kolobani
 Marani
 Naesakovo
 Norio
 Ontopo
 Pirveli Maisi
 Samikao
 Sepieti
 Sujuna
 Tqviri
 Tsqemi
 Zanati

Villages

 Abashispiri
 Bulvani
 Dzveli Abasha
 Dziguri
 Etseri
 Gamoghma zanati
 Gamoghma kodori
 Gaghma zanati
 Gaghma kodori
 Gautsqinari
 Gezati
 Gugunaqati
 Guleikari
 Gulukheti
 Ketilari
 Kvishanchala
 Kolobani
 Maidani
 Marani
 Maranchala
 Matskhovriskari
 Naesakovo
 Norio
 Ontopo
 Pirveli Maisi
 Sabokuchavo
 Sagvazavo
 Samikao
 Sepieti
 Sujuna
 Tsalikari
 Tkhmelari
 Tqviri
 Tsqemi
 Tsilori

See also
 List of municipalities in Georgia (country)

References

External links
 Districts of Georgia, Statoids.com
 Official web-page of Abasha Municipality
 Gallery

Municipalities of Samegrelo-Zemo Svaneti